Harpalus or Harpalos  may refer to:

Greek Antiquity
Harpalus courtier of Alexander the Great and embezzler of the Persian treasure.
Harpalus (astronomer)  astronomer of 5th-century BC
Harpalus (engineer) supposed engineer of Xerxes in the Hellespont
Harpalus (son of Polemaeus) statesman of Perseus of Macedon
Harpalus (mythology) mythological character of Laconia

Science
Harpalus (beetle) of carabid beetles
Harpalus (crater) on the moon